Cahit Süme (born 19 January 1972) is a Turkish boxer. He competed in the men's welterweight event at the 1996 Summer Olympics.

References

1972 births
Living people
Turkish male boxers
Olympic boxers of Turkey
Boxers at the 1996 Summer Olympics
Sportspeople from Trabzon
Welterweight boxers
20th-century Turkish people